The Medinah Temple is a large Moorish Revival  building in Chicago built by  Shriners architects Huehl & Schmid in 1912. 

It is located on the Near North Side of Chicago, Illinois at 600 N. Wabash Avenue, extending from Ohio Street to Ontario Street. 
In 2022, it was announced that the site will temporarily house a casino while the  $1.7B Bally's Casino  is under construction nearby.

History
The building originally housed an ornate auditorium seating approximately 4,200 on three levels. The stage floor extended a considerable distance into the auditorium, and the seating was arranged in a U-shape around it. The auditorium contained an Austin Organ Company pipe organ (opus no. 558), installed in 1915, with 92 ranks, a 5-manual fixed console and a 4-manual movable console (added in 1931). Among the many events that took place in this venue was the annual Shrine Circus. Additionally, WGN-TV used the Medinah Temple for The Bozo 25th Anniversary Special (telecast live September 7, 1986).

The fine acoustics of the Medinah Temple's auditorium made it a favorite site for recording. Many of the Chicago Symphony Orchestra's most famous recordings from the late 1960s (for RCA with then-music director Jean Martinon) through the 1980s (for Decca with then-music director Sir Georg Solti) were recorded there. World-renowned conductor Claudio Abbado recorded Gustav Mahler's Symphony No. 2 with the CSO there in February, 1976.  The music to Fantasia 2000 was recorded at the Medinah Temple auditorium from 1994 to 1996.

The auditorium also contained a five-manual, 92 rank pipe organ, Austin Organs Opus 558, installed in 1915. The instrument was the first five-manual instrument built by the firm and one of the largest in the city.  It was controlled by a five-manual gallery console and a movable four-manual console.  In March 2001 the City Council approved funding to remove the organ for eventual donation to a non-profit organization.  The instrument was re-installed in St. Raphael the Archangel Catholic Church in Old Mill Creek, Illinois.

Beginning in late 2000, the Medinah Shriners left the building, the exterior of the building was restored and the interior gutted and reconstructed for use as retail space. It was designated a Chicago Landmark on June 27, 2001. It used to be occupied by Bloomingdale's Home and Furniture Store, which opened in 2003. As of June 2019, Bloomingdale's parent company, Macy's, has sold the building to Chicago developer, Al Friedman. The store vacated the building in September 2020.

It was reported on May 5, 2022 that the Medinah Temple would host a temporary casino as part of the Bally's Chicago casino bid that was approved by Chicago Mayor Lori Lightfoot. The proposal still needs approval from the Chicago City Council and Illinois Gaming Board, so it is unknown when this temporary casino would open for business.

References

External links
 Conversion of the Medinah Temple from auditorium to retail space
 Property owner's webpage for Medinah Temple
 Medinah Shriners

Buildings and structures in Chicago
Former Masonic buildings in Illinois
Chicago Landmarks
Moorish Revival architecture in Illinois
Theatres completed in 1912
1912 establishments in Illinois
Shriners